George Bernard Young (September 22, 1930 – December 8, 2001) was an American football player, coach, and executive. He served as the general manager of the New York Giants from 1979 to 1997.  He was named NFL Executive of the Year five times.

Early life
Young was born on September 22, 1930 in Baltimore, Maryland.  Young grew up in Baltimore's 10th Ward (east Baltimore) in a tough Irish-Catholic neighborhood, living over a bakery that was run by his mother's side of the family, just across the street from his father's bar.  He was an outstanding football player at Calvert Hall College, a Catholic high school then located in Baltimore, Maryland. He attended Bucknell University, where he was a starting defensive tackle for three seasons, team captain in 1951, and a member of the Phi Lambda Theta fraternity.  He was named to the Little All-America first team and All-East first team in his senior year. Selected to play in the BlueGray game, he was selected by the Dallas Texans in the 1952 NFL Draft.

Young then began a coaching career in the Baltimore area school system, briefly at Calvert Hall and then he took over the Baltimore City College football team. During a 15-year span, his teams won six Maryland Scholastic Association championships. Tom Gatewood, tight end, and John Sykes, running back, were two of Coach Young's City athletes who would make it to the NFL, Kurt Schmoke, quarterback,  and Curt Anderson, linebacker, established themselves in the political realm.  Young was especially proud of his years as an educator, during which he taught history and political science. During that time he also earned two master's degrees from Johns Hopkins University and Loyola College.  In May 1987, he was awarded an honorary doctorate in humane letters from Western Maryland College.

Before being with the Giants
Prior to joining the Giants, Young was on the staffs of the Baltimore Colts (1968–1974), holding positions of scout, offensive line coach, director of player personnel, and offensive coordinator, and the Miami Dolphins (1975–1978), serving as director of personnel and pro scouting.

New York Giants
Young signed a five‐year contract to become general manager of the New York Giants on February 14, 1979, succeeding Andy Robustelli who had resigned 58 days earlier on December 18, 1978. His selection was a compromise between the team's co-owners Wellington Mara and his nephew Tim, both of whom had been feuding over the football operations since the late-1960s. Wellington's attempt to promote assistant director of football operations Terry Bledsoe and Tim's recommendation of hiring either Gil Brandt or Don Klosterman had only resulted in mutual disapproval.

Young joined a franchise which had failed to qualify for the postseason in its previous fifteen years. The drought was extended by the fallout over The Fumble the previous November which had been intensified by a fans revolt and cost Robustelli, head coach John McVay and offensive coordinator Bob Gibson their jobs.

In building the Giants Young placed special emphasis on the NFL Draft.  From his inaugural draft in 1979 through the 1995 selection process, he succeeded in signing every player drafted over that span, and from those drafts, a total of 119 players made the club at one time or another.  Instrumental in his reversal of the Giants’ fortunes was his drafting of standout players such as Phil Simms, Lawrence Taylor, Joe Morris, and Carl Banks, and selecting Bill Parcells as the club's head coach.

Success
During Young's tenure, the Giants earned eight playoff berths, highlighted by victories in Super Bowls XXI and XXV, and compiled an overall record of 155-139-2. He was named NFL Executive of the Year a record five times: in 1984, 1986, 1990, 1993, and 1997. Young also served as chairman of the NFL's Competition Committee.

Decline
Despite Young's success during the 1980s, that success would not continue into the 1990s. One of his first mistakes was his choice of a new head coach for the Giants after the May 1991 resignation of Bill Parcells. Young's selection of Ray Handley was not met with success as Handley won a total of 14 games in his two-year stint. Young—an opponent of free agency—seemed to lose his touch following the introduction of the free agency cycle following the 1992 regular season.  He struggled to adapt to the system, along with the introduction of a salary cap in 1994; he signed several players to overvalued contracts while losing much of the Giants core talent to other franchises following free agency's inception.

In addition, Young's draft magic seemed to disappear.  From 1991-1996, The Giants drafted six consecutive first round busts, although his later round selections during that time period would consist of several prominent, elite players, such as defensive tackle Keith Hamilton, defensive end Michael Strahan, cornerback Phillippi Sparks, linebacker Jessie Armstead, cornerback Jason Sehorn, fullback Charles Way, wide receiver Amani Toomer, and running back Tiki Barber. Young retired following the 1997 season, handing his duties over to assistant Ernie Accorsi.

George Young joined the National Football League as senior vice president of football operations on February 2, 1998, after serving 19 years as general manager of the New York Giants.

Young was a resident of Upper Saddle River, New Jersey.

Young died of a rare neurological disease on December 8, 2001 in Baltimore.

Honors
The George Young Award is presented annually by The National Jewish Sports Hall of Fame and Museum to the person, Jewish or non-Jewish, who "has best exemplified the high ideals that George Young displayed".

On January 15, 2020, Young was elected to the Pro Football Hall of Fame Centennial Class of 2020.

See also

 History of the New York Giants (1979–1993)
 History of the New York Giants (1994–present)

References

1930 births
2001 deaths
American football defensive tackles
Baltimore City College faculty
Baltimore Colts coaches
Baltimore Colts executives
Bucknell Bison football players
Miami Dolphins executives
New York Giants executives
National Football League general managers
High school football coaches in Maryland
Calvert Hall College High School alumni
Neurological disease deaths in Maryland
Players of American football from Baltimore
People from Upper Saddle River, New Jersey
Pro Football Hall of Fame inductees